Dual specificity protein phosphatase 23, also known as low molecular mass dual specificity phosphatase 3 (LDP-3), is an enzyme ( and ) that in humans is encoded by the DUSP23 gene.

References

Further reading

External links 
 

EC 3.1.3